The Kooikerhondje (Dutch for "Duck catcher's small dog") is a small spaniel-type breed of dog of Dutch ancestry that was originally used as a working dog, particularly in an eendenkooi (duck decoy) to lure ducks.  Kooikers were popular in the 17th and 18th century and appear in the paintings of Rembrandt and Jan Steen. The breed is gaining popularity in the United States, Canada and Scandinavia, where it is still relatively unknown.

Description

Appearance 
The Kooikerhondje is a small, flashy, orange and white spaniel-like sporting dog. Originally bred in the Netherlands as a duck decoy dog, its heavily white plumed tail waves jauntily to entice and lure ducks to follow it into Eendenkooi (elaborate manmade pond trapping systems). When not working the traps, Kooikers were expected to work on the farm to catch vermin.
The preferred height at the withers is 40 cm (16 inches in the U.S.) for males and 38 cm (15 inches in the U.S.) for females. The FCI standard allows variation of 38 to 41 cm for males, 36 to 39 cm for females. Allowable size in the United States is 14.5 to 17.5 inches for males, 13.5 to 16.5 inches for females. The proportion of the Kooiker is off-square. The bone and substance of the Kooiker is moderate.  The head should be in proportion to the dog.  The expression is gentle and alert. Ears should be orange-red in color and well feathered and ideally adorned with earrings. The color for the Kooiker should preferably be distinct patches of clear orange-red on pure white, although a few small spots on the legs are acceptable. Color should be predominate on the back with the chest, belly, blaze and the majority of the legs and tail white. Black ears. A black tail ring where the color changes from orange-red to white is permitted. A dog who is solid red on the back is acceptable but not preferred.

Temperament 
Kooikerhondjes are cheerful, good natured, friendly, quiet, well-behaved, and alert. Depending on its domestic environment, it is kind, happy and lively, but likely due to breeding, can be reactive to other dogs. They are also intelligent, attentive and more than willing to please their owner. The Kooikerhondje adapts to situations rather quickly, changing his behavior from quiet to lively when the situation allows them to be. They will not always immediately like strangers, instead choosing to retreat. But once they warm up to someone, the trust will be there for the rest of their life.
The Kooikerhondje can make a fine apartment dog if exercised regularly, but a fenced yard will be more ideal. They have a medium energy level, yet are usually quiet when indoors.  Kooikerhondje can be reactive with strange dogs and are wary of boisterous children, in general. Overall, Kooikerhondjes are great companions.

Health 

Kooikers have good appetites and a tendency to put on weight easily. Their life span is 12–15 years on average. As Kooikerhondjes have a small genetic base, hereditary diseases are somewhat prevalent. These include:
 von Willebrand's disease, a blood clotting disorder preventable through DNA testing
 Cataract and other eye diseases
 Patellar luxation
 Hereditary Necrotising Myelopathy (ENM), a fatal neurologic disease also preventable through DNA testing
 Polymyositis
 Epilepsy, a central nervous system disorder that causes dogs to have recurring seizures
 Kidney disorders

Today (due to a lot of hard work in the national clubs) most Kooikers used for breeding are free from von Willebrands disease (most national clubs require both male and female dogs to be free from this disease to be allowed to breed).

Patellar luxation is not a major problem in most countries at the moment, but is kept under a close watch to prevent it from becoming a problem again. In the Netherlands, eye tests are available and all breeders breeding according to the breed club's rules have to test their dogs. Only dogs that are free of eye diseases are allowed to be used for breeding. Testing for ENM became available in  2012. In the Netherlands, only dogs who are tested may be used for breeding. Only allowed breedings are Free x Free or Free X Carrier. Carrier to Carrier should never be done as the risk of this fatal disease is high. Puppy purchasers should inquire about the ENM status of the parents.

History 

The Kooikerhondje was developed in the Netherlands sometime prior to the 16th century to be a breed to lure ducks into traps - a technique also called tolling. They were used to lure  'kooien' (cages in the form of canals with traps at the ends), where the hunter (the so-called Kooiker) could easily catch the fowl. The dogs that were used by the Kooiker for this kind of hunting technique, were referred to as the 'Kooiker's hondjes' (literally: Kooiker's hounds). Eventually this led to this dog being called Kooikerhondje.

The breed almost became extinct during World War II until Baroness van Hardenbroek van Ammerstol rescued it. The breed was only officially recognized by the Raad van Beheer, the Dutch Kennel Club, in 1971 and has since been imported into other countries and recognised officially. The breed is still relatively unknown in North America and not yet recognized as a breed in Canada, although it was accepted into the AKC's Foundation Stock Service Program, in 2004.  The breed was moved to the AKC Miscellaneous Class on July 1, 2015 in preparation to moving to the Sporting Group upon full recognition. As of Jan 1, 2018, the Nederlandse Kooikerhondje has been fully recognized by the American Kennel Club and is now competing in the Sporting Group.  In the United States, both the UKC and ARBA recognize the breed.

In the U.K., the breed has been removed from the import list and is now eligible to enter Crufts for the Best in Show award, despite there being only 76 of the breed in the U.K.

In January 2013, the Kennel Club announced it was re-classifying the Kooikerhondje from the gundog group to the utility group effective from January 2014. The decision was reached after discussions with the U.K. breed clubs and unanimous agreement was achieved.

Some historians believe the Kooikerhondje may have possibly played a part in the development of the Nova Scotia Duck Tolling Retriever.

See also 
 Dogs portal
 List of dog breeds

References

External links 

 

FCI breeds
Dog breeds originating in the Netherlands
Rare dog breeds